Besim Kunić (born 13 February 1986) is a Swedish professional footballer who plays for Vendelsö IK as a midfielder.

References

External links 
 

1986 births
Living people
Swedish footballers
Vasalunds IF players
Syrianska FC players
Superettan players
Allsvenskan players
Association football midfielders